Park of Poland is an amusement and leisure park in central Poland, in the village of Wręcza in Żyrardów County, Masovian Voivodeship, about  southwest of the capital Warsaw. It opened for visitors on February 20, 2020. The first phase of the investment, the tropical water park Suntago, cost 70 000 000 million euro and provided 600 work places.

History 
Plans to build an amusement park appeared in 2011. It was said that construction would begin in 2013, yet since then the commencing of construction was delayed multiple times. Construction eventually began in May 2017. Construction of the first phase of the project, Suntago Wodny Świat (lit. "Suntago Water World") was completed in 2019. February 20, 2020 marked the opening of the water park.

Complex 

The construction of a 4-star hotel in the vicinity of the Suntago park is also planned.

Suntago Wodny Świat 
Suntago Wodny Świat (lit. Suntago Water World) is the largest covered water park in Poland and Europe, split into 3 themed zones: Jamango, Relax i Sauntaria.

The park is open everyday, Monday to Friday in the hours of 10am - 10pm, and on weekends in the hours of 9am - 10pm, and every day it can hold up to 15,000 people.

Jamango Wodna Dżungla 
In this zone (lit. The longest water slide, the Jungle Eclipse, measures  in length. Also found here are pontoon slides for 1, 2 and 4 people (Neon Torpedo, Tiger's Race, Hunters Raft Race I and Hunters Raft Race II, Mad Octopus, and Green Mamba); trapdoor slides (Jaw Drop, Crazy Drive); the eight-lane water slide Raindbow Race on which rider has to lie down on dedicated mats facing head first, as well as many others. There is also a wave pool, lazy rivers, the surfing simulator Surf-Air and an indoor and outdoor water park playground. The combined area of the pools is 2000 m².

Relax 
This is the zone dedicated to relaxation. The zone contains 400 palm trees, mainly from Florida, Costa Rica and Malaysia. Also located here is a thermal pool with an area of 840 m², a 20,000 m² garden, as well as a retractable roof. It will also be possible to get massages, and 3 "Dead Sea" pools, as well as sunrooms.

Saunaria 
The area of the sauna zone is 2500 m². It contains 12 themed attractions, including the saunas Łaźnia Turecka, Rajska Plaża, Aromatyczna, Valhalla, Wioska Egipska, Akwarium, and Koreańska Sala Wypoczynku.

Accommodation and Hotels

Suntago Village 
Planned is a complex of 92 bungalows. Its opening is planned shortly after the opening of the Suntago Wodny Świat.

Hotel 
Planned is also a 4-star hotel with 240 rooms with conference rooms, directly connected with Suntago Wodny Świat.

Transport Links 
Park of Poland is located between the S8 expressway and the A2 motorway. In 2018, the Mszczonów and Radziejowice communes, thanks to grants from the Masovian Voivodeship, built a road linking the water park with the National road 50.

Facts 
 During construction of the Park of Poland, more concrete was used than during the construction of the Palace of Culture and Science in Warsaw. During the construction 5000 tonnes of steel was used, about half the mass of the Eiffel Tower.

References 

2020 establishments in Poland
Tourist attractions in Masovian Voivodeship
Water parks in Poland
Żyrardów County
Indoor amusement parks